Ikolomani Constituency is an electoral constituency in Kenya. It is one of twelve constituencies in Kakamega County. The constituency was established for the 1963 elections.

Total area in square km is 143.6 approximately and the population stood at 111,743 according to the 2019 census.

Members of Parliament

Wards 

The constituency has three wards, all electing member of county Assembly for the Kakamega County Assembly.

References 

Constituencies in Kakamega County
Constituencies of Western Province (Kenya)
1963 establishments in Kenya
Constituencies established in 1963